Arctotheca calendula is a plant in the sunflower family commonly known as capeweed, plain treasureflower, cape dandelion, or cape marigold because it originates from the Cape Province in South Africa. It is also found in neighboring KwaZulu-Natal.

Description
Arctotheca calendula is a squat perennial or annual which grows in rosettes and sends out stolons and can spread across the ground quickly. The leaves are covered with white woolly hairs, especially on their undersides. The leaves are lobed or deeply toothed. Hairy stems bear daisy-like flowers with small yellow petals that sometimes have a green or purple tint surrounded by white or yellow ray petals extending further out from the flower centers.

Cultivation
It is cultivated as an attractive ornamental groundcover but has invasive potential when introduced to a new area. The plant can reproduce vegetatively or via seed. Seed-bearing plants are most likely to become weedy, taking hold most easily in bare or sparsely vegetated soil or disturbed areas.

Spread
Arctotheca calendula is naturalized in California, Spain, Portugal, Italy, Australia, and New Zealand, and considered a noxious weed in some of those places.

References

External links
Jepson Manual Treatment
New South Wales Flora
Herbigude, Capeweed photograph, capeweed description and capeweed diagram from HerbiGuide.
Capeweed at EncycloWeedia
Invasive Plants of California's Wildlands
Queensland Government Factsheet

Arctotideae
Flora of South Africa
Taxa named by Carl Linnaeus